Fangatau, or Nakai-erua, is a small atoll in the Tuamotu group in French Polynesia. The nearest land is Fakahina Atoll, located 72 km to the ESE. This small atoll has an elongated shape. Its reef encloses its lagoon completely. Anchorage is difficult. Fangatau Atoll has 135 inhabitants (2017 census). Teana is the main village.

History
The first recorded European to arrive at Fangatau was Russian explorer Fabian Gottlieb von Bellingshausen on the 10 July 1820 on ships Vostok and Mirni. He named this atoll "Arakcheev". Fangatau was the home of Kamake an Iturangi, regarded by anthropologist Kenneth Emory as "the greatest Tuamotuan sage" he ever met.

Administration
The commune of Fangatau consists of Fangatau Atoll, as well as the atoll and associated commune of Fakahina. The seat of the commune is the village Teana.

Transport 
The atoll is served by the Fangatau Airport .

See also
Fangatau Airport

References

Oceandots
Fangatau Airport
Bellingshausen

External links

Atoll list (in French)

Communes of French Polynesia
Atolls of the Tuamotus